Farnum House may refer to the following American homes:

 Farnum House, Norfolk, Connecticut, on the National Register of Historic Places (NRHP)
 Coronet John Farnum Jr. House, Uxbridge, Massachusetts, on the NRHP
 Moses Farnum House, Uxbridge, Massachusetts, on the NRHP
 William and Mary Farnum House, Uxbridge, Massachusetts, on the NRHP
 Farnum House, Carriage House Historic District, Miles City, Montana

See also
 Farnum Block, a commercial building in Uxbridge, Massachusetts, on the NRHP